The National Mission on Libraries India, an initiative of the Ministry of Culture under the Government of India, works to modernise and digitally link nearly 9,000 libraries across India to provide readers access to books and information. The project costs around 1000 crores. The scheme was approved on 28 November 2013 and the President of India, Pranab Mukherjee launched the National Mission on Libraries on 2014 at Rashtrapati Bhavan.

Background
The National Knowledge Commission gave 10 recommendation on libraries in its 2011 report. Based on these recommendations Government of India started the National Mission on Libraries under the Indian Ministry of Culture. Raja Rammohun Roy Library Foundation (RRRLF), an autonomous body under the Ministry of Culture, will be the central agency for the National Mission on Libraries for administrative, logistics, planning and budgeting purposes.

Working groups

Mission has four working groups for its main advisory function. These are:
Upgrade of existing public libraries, college libraries, school libraries, and shifting the use of school libraries as community libraries chaired by Shri B S Baswan.
Library and Information Science education, training and research facilities chaired by Professor A. R. D. Prasad.
Setting up the National Virtual Library, networking and ICT applications in libraries, chaired by Dr. H K Kaul.
National Census of Libraries, Content Creation and Community Information Centers, chaired by Dr. Subbiah Arunachalam.

References

External links
National Mission on Libraries

2013 establishments in India
Libraries in India